Slut is the first and only EP by Flesh Volcano, released in 1987 by Some Bizzare Records.

Track listing
All songs by Marc Almond / Clint Ruin.
"Slut"  – 5:31
"The Universal Cesspool"  – 6:53
"Bruise N Chain"  – 4:20

Personnel
Marc Almond: voice
Clint Ruin: instruments

Re-issues
In 1997, the Slut EP appeared in two different CDs reissued by Some Bizzare. The first, Violent Silence•Flesh Volcano, appended the Marc Almond solo record Violent Silence. However, it was almost immediately recalled and a different release, Flesh Volcano•Slut, took its place, adding additional Almond/Ruin collaborations in place of the Almond solo work. This second version was also released by Thirsty Ear, which was simply titled Slut, in February 1998.

Violent Silence•Flesh Volcano (Some Bizzare)
Songs 4–8 by Almond
"The Universal Cesspool"
"Bruise N Chain"
"Flesh Volcano (Slut)"
"Blood Tide" performer Annie Hogan written by Annie Hogan
"Healthy as Hate" performer Annie Hogan vocalist Marc Almond
"Things You Love for Me" performer Annie Hogan vocalist Marc Almond
"Body Unknown" performer Annie Hogan vocalist Marc Almond
"Unborn Stillborn" performer Annie Hogan vocalist Marc Almond

Flesh Volcano•Slut (Some Bizzare) and Slut (Thirsty Ear)
"Slut" – 5:31
"The Universal Cesspool" – 6:53
"Bruise N Chain" – 4:20
"Love Amongst the Ruined" – 6:36
Performer: Marc Almond Annie Hogan
Producer: Clint Ruin (as J. G. Thirlwell)
"Burning Boats" – 5:59
Performer: Annie Hogan
Vocals: Marc Almond (as Raoul Revere)
Producer: Clint Ruin
"A Million Manias" – 10:16
Performer: Marc and the Mambas
Featuring: Clint Ruin (as Karl Satan and the Transvestites from Hell)
"Beat Out That Rhythm on a Drum" – 4:58
Performer: Marc and the Mambas
Drums: Clint Ruin (as Frank Want)

Charts

References

External links
Slut at foetus.org

1987 debut EPs
JG Thirlwell albums
Albums produced by JG Thirlwell
Some Bizzare Records EPs